China Bay Airport is an air force base and domestic airport in China Bay in eastern Sri Lanka.

Originally built by the British, it was transferred to the Royal Ceylonese Air Force which later became the Sri Lanka Air Force.

History
During the 1920s the British built an airfield in China Bay in eastern Ceylon.  The Royal Air Force (RAF) established an airfield called RAF Station China Bay in March 1942 with Hurricane, Spitfire and Catalina aircraft.

A number of RAF squadrons (17, 159, 205, 240, 258, 261, 273, 321, 357, 648) and other units were stationed at the airfield during and immediately after the war.  The airfield was bombed by the Japanese on 9 April 1942 during World War II. The airfield was upgraded to accommodate the USAAF Boeing B-29 Superfortress over the first half of 1944. After these upgrades were complete it was used to stage the B-29 attack force for the unsuccessful Operation Boomerang raid on oil refineries at Palembang in August 1944.

After independence, the British maintained two military airfields in Ceylon, the RAF station at Katunayake and the Royal Navy base in Trincomalee, and camps at Diyatalawa.  The naval base in Trincomalee included the airfield in China Bay.  It was opened to civilian flights in 1952. All British military airfields/barracks and sites in the country were transferred and taken over by the Ceylonese government in November 1957. RAF China Bay became RCyAF China Bay. It became SLAF Base China Bay in May 1972. The base was turned into the Sri Lanka Air Force Academy in March 1976. The academy was made an air force base in January 1987 due to the civil war.

Airlines and destinations
Passenger

Cargo

Lodger Units
 No. 01 Flying Training Wing
 No. 06 Air Defence Radar Squadron
 No. 112 Surveillance Squadron

Air Force Academy
The base houses the Sri Lanka Air Force Academy. Established in 1976, the academy is where the Sri Lanka Air Force conducts its initial officer training.  Currently there are three lodger formations carrying out training:
 Combat Training School
 Junior Command & Staff College
 Non-Commissioned Officers Management School

References

External links
 Sri Lanka Air Force China Bay

1920s establishments in Ceylon
Airports in Sri Lanka
Sri Lanka Air Force bases
Transport buildings and structures in Trincomalee District
World War II sites in Sri Lanka